Breaking My Heart may refer to:

"Breaking My Heart" (The Peppermints song)
Breaking My Heart (Reiley song), 2023
"Breaking My Heart", a single by Tony Di Bart
"Breaking My Heart", a single by Roni Griffith, 1983
"Breaking My Heart", a song by Gerald Levert from the album Love & Consequences
"Breaking My Heart", a song by Michael Learns to Rock from Nothing to Lose
"Breaking My Heart", a song by OMC from the album How Bizarre
"Breaking My Heart", a song by Al Epp and The Pharaohs, 1959
"Breaking My Heart", a song by Warren Williams, 1966

See also
Don't Go Breaking My Heart (disambiguation)